Abū Ḥafs Zayn al-Dīn ʻUmar ibn al-Muẓaffar Ibn al-Wardī,  known as Ibn al-Wardi, was an Arab historian -, the author of Kharīdat al-ʿAjā'ib wa farīdat al-gha'rāib ("The Pearl of wonders and the Uniqueness of strange things"), a geographical treatise with sections on natural history. He also wrote Tarikh Ibn al-Wardi ("The History by Ibn al-Wardi").

Kharidat 

The Kharīdat summed up the geographical knowledge of the Arabic world of the time, referring to climate, terrain, fauna and flora, population, way of living, existing states and their governments in individual regions of the world. The work was accompanied by a coloured world map and a picture of Ka'bah.

Although in the book al-Wardi credits al-Mas'udi, al-Tusi and several other sources, Mohamed Bencheneb claimed it was merely a plagiarism of a book by Egyptian writer Najm ad-Dīn Aḥmad ibn Ḥamdān ibn Shabib al-Ḥanbali (ca. 1332), entitled Jāmi ʿal-Funūn wa-Salwat al-Maḥzūn. As for the first chapter of the Kharidat, although it may have well come indirectly through al-Ḥanbali as Bencheneb suggests, it is in fact very nearly a copy from Yaqut's Mu'jam ul-Buldān, including similar phraseology.

The author also speaks about Slavs and their lifestyle and mentions al-Mahdiyya as the residence of the Fatimid dynasty. Therefore, the book is older than the city of Kairo (founded in 969 C. E.).

References 
Citations

Bibliography

External links 
 http://portal.unesco.org/ci/en/ev.php-URL_ID=17261&URL_DO=DO_TOPIC&URL_SECTION=201.html

See also 
 Ibn Al Ouardy

1290s births
1349 deaths
14th-century Arabs
Medieval Syrian geographers
14th-century geographers
Year of birth unknown
Disease-related deaths in the medieval Islamic world
People from Maarat al-Numan
14th-century deaths from plague (disease)